Qajariyeh may refer to:
 Qajariyeh 1, Khuzestan Province
 Qajariyeh 2, Khuzestan Province
 Qajariyeh, Tehran